Auratonota omorpha is a species of moth of the family Tortricidae. It is found in Costa Rica.

The wingspan is about 18 mm. The ground colour of the forewings is whitish with large groups of refractive, pearl white scales along the edges, suffused ochreous medially except for a large subcostal blotch. The markings are rust brown. The hindwings are brown with a few ochreous cream dots in the distal area.

References

Moths described in 2000
Auratonota
Moths of Central America